Milica (pronounced 'Millitsa') is a feminine name popular in Balkan countries. It is a diminutive form of the given name Mila, meaning 'kind', 'dear' or 'sweet'. The name was used for a number of queens and princesses, including Milica of Serbia, wife of Tsar Lazar, who is honored as a saint in the  Serbian Orthodox Church. Milica has been the most popular name for girls born in Serbia since 1991, and is overall the most common female given name in the country. The name is occasionally given the phonetic spelling Milizza in English speaking countries. The name of Princess Milica of Montenegro was often translated as Milizza in English language publications.

Individuals named Milica
Milica of Serbia (1335–1405), Princess of Serbia, wife of Lazar of Serbia
Milica Despina (1485–1554), Princess consort of Wallachia, wife of Neagoe Basarab
Milica of Montenegro (1866–1951), Montenegrin princess
Milica Branković (died 1464), Serbian princess, wife of Leonardo III Tocco
Milica Čubrilo (born 1969), Serbian politician and diplomat
Milica Dabović (born 1982), Serbian basketball player
Milica Davies (born 1981 as Milica Ilić), Australian classical guitarist
Milica Gardašević (born 1998), Serbian long jumper
Milica Janković (1881–1939), Serbian writer
Milla Jovovich (born 1975 as Milicaa Jovović), American actress, model and musician
Milica Kacin Wohinz (born 1930), Slovenian historian
Milica Majstorović (born 1989), Serbian singer
Milica Mandić (born 1991), Serbian taekwondo athlete
Milica Mićić Dimovska (1947–2013), Serbian writer
Milica Miljanov (born ca. 1860), Montenegrin soldier and WWI heroine
Mila Mulroney (born 1953 as Milica Pivnički), wife of Canadian Prime Minister Brian Mulroney
Milica Ninković (1854–1881), Serbian feminist, translator and editor
Milica Pap (born 1973), Yugoslavian pianist
Milica Pavlović (born 1991), Serbian singer
Milica Pejanović-Đurišić (born 1959), Montenegrin politician
Milica Rakić (1996–1999), three-year-old child killed during the NATO bombing of Yugoslavia
Milica Šterić (1914–1998), Serbian architect
Milica Stojadinović-Srpkinja (1828–1878), Serbian poet
Milica Šviglin Čavov, Croatian female doctor
Milica Todorović (born 1990), Serbian singer and actress
Milica Tomić (born 1960), Serbian artist

Popular culture
 Milica Bellic, the mother of Niko Bellic, the main protagonist of Grand Theft Auto IV

 Militsa Gnosis, a love interest of Valkyrie Cain, the main protagonist of Skulduggery Pleasant.

See also
 Slavic names

Notes

Serbian feminine given names
Croatian feminine given names
Slovene feminine given names
Macedonian feminine given names
Bulgarian feminine given names
Slavic feminine given names